Bhekimpilo Ncube (born 29 September 1983) is a retired Zimbabwean football midfielder.

References

1985 births
Living people
Zimbabwean footballers
Hwange Colliery F.C. players
Zimbabwe Saints F.C. players
Dynamos F.C. players
Motor Action F.C. players
F.C. Platinum players
Highlanders F.C. players
Chicken Inn F.C. players
Bulawayo City F.C. players
Zimbabwe international footballers
Association football midfielders
Zimbabwe Premier Soccer League players
Sportspeople from Bulawayo
Zimbabwe A' international footballers
2011 African Nations Championship players